Sonora Independent School District is a public school district based in Sonora, Texas (USA). The district's boundaries parallel that of Sutton County.

In 2009, the school district was rated "academically acceptable" by the Texas Education Agency.

Schools
The district has three campuses:

Sonora High School (Grades 9-12)
Sonora Middle School (Grades 5-8)
Sonora Elementary School (Grades PK-4)

References

External links

School districts in Sutton County, Texas